Antonio Codina (born 29 December 1943) is a Spanish former swimmer. He competed in the men's 4 × 200 metre freestyle relay at the 1964 Summer Olympics.

References

External links
 

1943 births
Living people
Olympic swimmers of Spain
Swimmers at the 1964 Summer Olympics
Swimmers from Barcelona
Spanish male freestyle swimmers